Better Place Forests is the company that created America's first conservation memorial forests. Their forests are sustainable alternatives to cemeteries. Instead of graves and tombstones, families choose a private, protected family tree to return their ashes to the earth together.

History
The San Francisco, California based company, Better Place Forests Co., was founded in 2015 by Sandy Gibson, Brad Milne and Jamie Knowlton. The company focuses on end-of-life planning and forest conservation. 

As of May 2020, the company had five forest locations: Point Arena, California; Santa Cruz, California; Flagstaff, Arizona; St. Croix Valley, Minnesota; and a 130-acre site in Falls Village, Connecticut. In March 2021, it announced that it had purchased a 60-acre site in Ogle County, Illinois.

As of July 2021, the company had raised $52 million in funding.

References

Death care companies of the United States